Bonne Bell is a cosmetics company aimed for teens. The company was best known for its line of astringents and cleansers named "10-0-6." In the 1970s, they expanded into a popular range of lip balms called Lip Smackers which became the company's signature product.

History

Bonne Bell was founded in 1927 in Lakewood, Ohio, a suburb of Cleveland, by cosmetics salesman Jesse Bell, who named it after his daughter. Bell made his products on a hot plate in his basement and then sold his skin care products door to door.

In the 1950s, the company pursued the outdoor market and developed sun blockers, heavy-duty moisturizers, and lip protectors for skiers, hikers, and joggers. In the 1960s, Bonne Bell sponsored the U.S. Ski Team and many other amateur and professional sports events. In 1972 the company sponsored 10K marathons in 15 cities and many charitable races. By 1985 the business had grown into a $50 million enterprise.

In 2007 the company largely relocated to Australia, and reduced American domestic representation. The relocation was largely at the request of the Vice President of Ideation, Hilary Bell, to the then CMO, James Ward, in a bid to globalize the "Smackers" Brand.  By 2009, the company had returned to the United States.

In January 2015, the company announced that the Bonne Bell and Lip Smackers brands would be acquired by Markwins International, though Bonne Bell will continue to distribute other brands in Europe, Asia, and Australia under the name Bell Family Brands. In accordance, the company also announced the partial closure of its headquarters effective March 2015.

Lip Smackers
In 1973, Bonne Bell introduced a flavored lip pomade called "Lip Smackers" aimed originally at skiers then later at pre-teens and teens once they caught on to the trend. The first flavors launched were strawberry, green apple, and orange chocolate.

In 2014, Swarovski partnered with Lip Smacker to produce three of their biggies, a larger version of a normal Lip Smacker, covered in over five hundred Swarovski crystals. The Swarovski Lip Smacker biggies are priced at $250 each, making them the most expensive lip product compared to the likes of MAC or Lancôme. In 2015, Buddy Bell sold the family brands, Lip Smacker and Bonne Bell to Markwins International.

References

External links
Lip Smackers

Cosmetics companies of the United States
Chemical companies established in 1927
Companies based in Ohio
Lakewood, Ohio
1927 establishments in Ohio